Fernando Ponce de Cabrera may refer to either of two half-brothers who were noblemen of the Kingdom of León:
Fernando Ponce de Cabrera el Mayor (fl. 1161–1171), son of Ponce de Cabrera and his first wife, Sancha
Fernando Ponce de Cabrera el Menor (fl. 1163–1200), son of Ponce de Cabrera and his second wife, María Fernández